Algoma—Manitoulin  is a provincial electoral district in Ontario, Canada, that has been represented in the Legislative Assembly of Ontario since 1934.

Between 1986 and 1999, the district consisted of all of Algoma District minus two townships south of Hearst, an area of the southeast, which included Elliot Lake and everything east of it, and the city of Sault Ste. Marie.

In 1996, Ontario was divided into the same electoral districts as those used for federal electoral purposes. They were redistributed whenever a readjustment took place at the federal level.

In 2005, legislation was passed by the Legislature to divide Ontario into 107 electoral districts, beginning with the next provincial election in 2007. The eleven northern electoral districts, including Algoma—Manitoulin, are those defined for federal purposes in 1996, based on the 1991 census (except for a minor boundary adjustment). The 96 southern electoral districts are those defined for federal electoral purposes in 2003, based on the 2001 census. Without this legislation, the number of electoral districts in northern Ontario would have been reduced from eleven to ten.

Members of Provincial Parliament
This riding has elected the following members of the Legislative Assembly of Ontario:

Election results

2007 electoral reform referendum

Notes

Sources
 Elections Ontario Results
Elections Ontario Past Election Results
1999 results
2003 results
2007 results
2018 Riding map from Elections Ontario

Elliot Lake
Espanola, Ontario
Ontario provincial electoral districts